The Tour of Albania is a multi-day cycling race held annually in Albania. In 2017, the race was added to the UCI Europe Tour calendar in category 2.2.

Winners

References

Cycle races in Albania
UCI Europe Tour races
Recurring sporting events established in 1925
Spring (season) events in Albania